Gowland is an English surname. Notable people with the surname include:

Daniel Gowland (1798–1883), English merchant and banker
Don Gowland (born 1940), Australian sports shooter
Gibson Gowland (1877–1951), English film actor
Lance Gowland (1935–2008), Australian activist
Peter Gowland (1916–2010), American photographer and actor
Ralph Gowland (c. 1722 – c. 1782), British politician
Sam Gowland (born 1995), English television personality
Thomas Gowland (1768–1833), English trader
Tony Gowland (born 1945), English track cyclist
William Gowland (1842–1922), English mining engineer
Frederick Gowland Hopkins (1861–1947), English biochemist

English-language surnames